Northwoods Mall is a 101-store super-regional  indoor shopping mall located in North Charleston, South Carolina. It is the second largest indoor shopping mall in the Tri-County area next to Citadel Mall. Built in 1972, the mall is located at the intersection of Rivers Avenue (U.S. Highway 52), Ashley Phosphate Road and Interstate 26.  Northwoods Mall was the first regional indoor shopping mall constructed in the South Carolina lowcountry and featured Belk, Sears, and the locally owned Kerrison's department stores as its original anchor tenants. A food court offers options such as Charleys Philly Steaks and Sbarro. The mall's anchor stores are Dillard's, Belk, JCPenney and Burlington. Northwoods Mall also features Books-A-Million and Planet Fitness as inline junior anchors. 

The mall also once housed a Woolworth's but it was remodeled into the food court in 1997.  In 1989 the mall closed its small theater in favor of a multi-screen complex located just outside of Dillard's. The mall underwent a significant expansion and renovation in 1985 and Thalhimer's was added as an anchor tenant. Lost in the remodel was a Morrison's Cafeteria located next to Kerrison's.  

In 1992 Kerrison's was demolished and replaced by JCPenney. Also that year, Thalhimer's was sold to Dillard's. The store would later be expanded in 2004. The mall was purchased in 1984 by Jacobs, Visconsi & Jacobs (later known as the Richard E. Jacobs group), owners and developers of Charleston's Citadel Mall, and later sold to current owners CBL & Associates Properties who again remodeled the mall in 2004.  CBL & Associates Properties owned Citadel Mall until defaulting on mortgage payments and losing it to the lien-holder in a foreclosure sale in 2014.

In 2015, Sears Holdings spun off 235 of its properties, including the Sears at Northwoods Mall, into Seritage Growth Properties. Sears closed its store in July 2017 and the building was subdivided with half left vacant and half becoming Burlington. Carrabba's is also an outparcel on the Seritage site.

The mall concourses and all of the department stores are one level in design, with JCPenney as the only two-level store.

References

Buildings and structures in Charleston County, South Carolina
Shopping malls in South Carolina
Buildings and structures in North Charleston, South Carolina
Shopping malls established in 1972
CBL Properties
1972 establishments in South Carolina